Catete is a neighborhood in the South Zone of Rio de Janeiro, Brazil. It has strong commerce, with the majority of population being middle class.

History
Catete has many historic buildings dating from the colonial period. The district was one of the noblest in Rio until the transfer of the capital city from Rio de Janeiro to Brasília, when its real estate values declined.

Metro stations
Catete is served by two metro stations: Catete and Largo do Machado.

References

Neighbourhoods in Rio de Janeiro (city)